The 26th Emmy Awards, later known as the 26th Primetime Emmy Awards, were handed out on May 28, 1974. The ceremony was hosted by Johnny Carson. Winners are listed in bold and networks are in parentheses.

The top shows of the night were M*A*S*H and Upstairs, Downstairs. M*A*S*H and The Waltons had the most major nominations with nine. The Autobiography of Miss Jane Pittman led the night with four major wins.

For this ceremony, individual awards dubbed "Super Emmys" were given out in addition to the traditional categories. The individual categories were dropped the following year and have not returned since.

Winners and nominees

Programs

Acting

Lead performances

Supporting performances

Directing

Writing

Super Emmys
The Primetime Super Emmy Award was a set of 14 awards that were given in conjunction with the traditional Emmy Awards at the 1974 ceremony.

Winners of a traditional Emmy would then compete against their genre counterpart from the same category (comedy vs. drama for "Series", miniseries vs. telefilm for "Special"). This format would prove to be the Super Emmy's undoing. In order to vote on a Super Emmy winner, the traditional Emmy winners had to be announced well before the ceremony.

Several members of the Television Academy were against implementing the new awards. Super Emmy winners Alan Alda and Mary Tyler Moore were some of the loudest detractors. Both threatened to resign from the academy if they were installed. During their acceptance speeches, Moore said that comparing comedic and dramatic television was "apples to oranges". Alda went one step further in his speech "it's comparing apples to oranges to Volkswagens."

The Super Emmy was never awarded again.

Acting

Directing

Writing

Craft categories

Most major nominations
By network 
 CBS – 71
 NBC – 23
 ABC – 18

By program
 M*A*S*H (CBS) / The Waltons (CBS) – 9
 Mary Tyler Moore (CBS) – 8
 The Glass Menagerie (ABC) – 6
 All in the Family (CBS) – 5
 The Autobiography of Miss Jane Pittman (CBS) / The Blue Knight (NBC) – 4

Most major awards
By network 
 CBS – 27
 ABC – 6
 NBC – 5

By program
 The Autobiography of Miss Jane Pittman (CBS) – 4
 The Carol Burnett Show (CBS) / Mary Tyler Moore (CBS) / M*A*S*H (CBS) – 3
 The Blue Knight / The Glass Menagerie (ABC) – 2

Notes

References

External links
 Emmys.com list of 1974 Nominees & Winners
 

026
Primetime Emmy Awards
1974 in Los Angeles
May 1974 events in the United States